Leptochloa is a widespread genus of Asian, African, Australian, and American plants in the grass family.

Members of the genus are commonly known as sprangletops.

The generic name is derived from the Greek words ληπτος (leptos), meaning "thin," and χλοα (chloa), meaning "grass," referring to the inflorescences.

 Species
 Leptochloa aquatica Scribn. & Merr. - Mexico
 Leptochloa asthenes (Roem. & Schult.) C.E.Hubb.  - Australia
 Leptochloa barbata (Desv.) Nicora - Paraguay, Argentina
 Leptochloa caudata (K.Schum.) N.W.Snow - East Africa
 Leptochloa chinensis (L.) Nees – Asian sprangletop, Chinese sprangletop - eastern + southeastern Asia, Indian Subcontinent, eastern + southern Africa
 Leptochloa chloridiformis (Hack.) Parodi – Argentine sprangletop - Paraguay, Argentina, Uruguay
 Leptochloa coerulescens Steud.  - Africa
 Leptochloa decipiens (R.Br.) Stapf ex Maiden – Australian sprangletop - Australia
 Leptochloa digitata (R.Br.) Domin - Australia
 Leptochloa divaricatissima S.T.Blake - Australia
 Leptochloa ligulata Lazarides - Queensland
 Leptochloa longa Griseb. - Panama, Trinidad
 Leptochloa malayana (C.E.Hubb.) Jansen ex Veldkamp - Thailand, Borneo, Malaysia
 Leptochloa monticola Chase - Hispaniola
 Leptochloa mucronata (Michx.) Kunth - south-central USA, Mesoamerica, Bermuda, Trinidad, Netherlands Antilles, Bolivia, Ecuador, Peru, Galápagos
 Leptochloa nealleyi Vasey - Mexico, southern USA (Arizona, Texas, Louisiana)
 Leptochloa neesii (Thwaites) Benth. - Australia, Maluku, Java, Myanmar, India, Sri Lanka
 Leptochloa panicea (Retz.) Ohwi – mucronate sprangletop - Americas incl West Indies; tropical + subtropical Asia; naturalised in Africa, Australia etc.
 Leptochloa panicoides (J.Presl) Hitchc. - central + southeastern USA, Mesoamerica, Colombia, Peru, Brazil
 Leptochloa scabra Nees - from Alabama to Paraguay
 Leptochloa simoniana N.Snow - New Guinea, Queensland
 Leptochloa southwoodii N.Snow & B.K.Simon - Queensland
 Leptochloa squarrosa Pilg. - Tanzania (incl. Pemba), Comoros, Madagascar
 Leptochloa srilankensis N.Snow - Sri Lanka
 Leptochloa tectoneticola (Backer) Jansen ex Veldkamp - Cambodia, Thailand, Java
 Leptochloa virgata (L.) P.Beauv. – tropic sprangletop - from South Carolina to Paraguay
 Leptochloa viscida (Scribn.) Beal - California, Arizona, New Mexico, Texas, Baja California, Baja California Sur, Sonora, Sinaloa, Chihuahua

 Formerly included
see Arundinella Acrachne Bouteloua Chloris Coelachyrum Cynodon Desmostachya Dinebra Diplachne Disakisperma Eleusine Enteropogon Eragrostis Gouinia Gymnopogon Leptocarydion Myriostachya Pogonarthria Rostraria Trichoneura Trichloris Trigonochloa Tripogon

References

External links
 
 Grassbase - The World Online Grass Flora

Chloridoideae
Grasses of Africa
Grasses of Asia
Grasses of North America
Grasses of Oceania
Poaceae genera
Taxa named by Palisot de Beauvois